Ulza Maksuti (born 8 July 1999) is a Macedonian footballer who plays as a forward for 1. liga club ŽFK ACT Junajted and the North Macedonia women's national team.

References

1999 births
Living people
Women's association football forwards
Macedonian women's footballers
North Macedonia women's international footballers
Albanian footballers from North Macedonia